Judith Ryan Fergin (born 1951) was the United States ambassador to East Timor.  Her term of appointment began on September 9, 2010, succeeding Hans G. Klemm, and ended in 2013.

Fergin received a B.A. degree from Smith College and M.A. degrees from the University of Virginia and the Industrial College of the Armed Forces of the National Defense University.

She is a career member of the Senior Foreign Service. She was previously Deputy Chief of Mission in Embassy Singapore and Consul General in Sydney, Australia. She has also served as Economic Counselor at the U.S. Embassy in Canberra and the U.S. Embassy in Jakarta, as well as in overseas posts in Russia, Liberia, South Africa, and Germany.

Honours

Foreign Honours

 Medal of the Order of Timor-Leste, Timor Leste (May 16, 2012)

References

External links

 Judith Fergin (1951–), Office of the Historian, U.S. Department of State

Smith College alumni
University of Virginia alumni
Dwight D. Eisenhower School for National Security and Resource Strategy alumni
Ambassadors of the United States to East Timor
Living people
Recipients of the Order of Timor-Leste
1951 births
United States Foreign Service personnel
American women ambassadors
21st-century American diplomats
21st-century American women